Campaspe (Greek: Καμπάσπη, Kampaspē), or Pancaste (Greek: Πανκάστη, Pankastē; also Pakate), was a supposed mistress of Alexander the Great and a prominent citizen of Larissa in Thessaly. No Campaspe appears in the five major sources for the life of Alexander and the story may be apocryphal. The biographer Robin Lane Fox traces her legend back to the Roman authors Pliny (Natural History), Lucian of Samosata and Aelian's Varia Historia. Aelian surmised that she initiated the young Alexander in love.

According to tradition, she was painted by Apelles, who had the reputation in antiquity for being the greatest of painters. The episode occasioned an apocryphal exchange that was reported in Pliny's Natural History:<ref>John J. Popovic, "Apelles, the greatest painter of Antiquity" Source quotes from Natural History 35.79–97.</ref> "Seeing the beauty of the nude portrait, Alexander saw that the artist appreciated Campaspe (and loved her) more than he. And so Alexander kept the portrait, but presented Campaspe to Apelles." Fox describes this bequest as "the most generous gift of any patron and one which would remain a model for patronage and painters on through the Renaissance." Apelles also used Campaspe as a model for his most celebrated painting of Aphrodite  "rising out of the sea", the iconic Venus Anadyomene, "wringing her hair, and the falling drops of water formed a transparent silver veil around her form".

 Legacy 
Campaspe became a generic poetical synonym for a man's mistress; The English University wit and poet John Lyly (1553–1606), who produced his comedy Campaspe in 1584, also wrote:

The Spanish playwright Pedro Calderón de la Barca wrote his own play on the Campaspe story, Darlo todo y no dar nada (1651).

In 1819, the painting Générosité d'Alexandre'', by Jérôme-Martin Langlois depicted the scene where Alexander the Great gifted Campaspe to Apelles.

The Campaspe River in Victoria, Australia, the Campaspe River in Queensland, Australia and the Shire of Campaspe are named after her.

References

Sources

Pothos.org: Alexander's lovers
Harry Thurston Peck, Harper's Dictionary of Classical Antiquities, 1898 "Campaspe"
John Lyly: "Cupid and my Campaspe..."
John Lyly: A Moste Excellent Comedie of Alexander, Campaspe, and Diogenes 1584

4th-century BC Greek women
Ancient Larissaeans
Courtiers of Alexander the Great
Mistresses of Alexander the Great
Ancient Thessalian women